Tenacibaculum mesophilum is a bacterium. It was first isolated from sponge and green algae which were collected on the coast of Japan and Palau. Its type strain is MBIC 1140T (= IFO 16307T).

References

Further reading

External links 
LPSN
WORMS entry
Type strain of Tenacibaculum mesophilum at BacDive -  the Bacterial Diversity Metadatabase

Flavobacteria
Bacteria described in 2001